The Royal Standard Flag of Australia was the personal flag of Elizabeth II in her role as Queen of Australia. It was used in a similar way as the Royal Standard in the UK, signaling the Australian Monarch's presence in Australia, in this case.

History
The flag was approved for use on 20 September 1962, and used for the first time during Queen Elizabeth II's 1963 royal tour.

Description

The late queen's flag consisted of a banner of the coat of arms of Australia, defaced with a gold seven-pointed federation star with a blue disc containing the letter E below a crown, surrounded by a garland of golden roses.

Each of the six sections of the flag represents the heraldic badge of the Australian states, and the whole is surrounded by an ermine border representing the federation of the states:

The Upper Left represents New South Wales and bears a red St George's Cross, upon which is a gold lion in the centre and a gold star on each arm.
The Upper Middle represents Victoria and contains a Crown and five white stars on a blue field.
The Upper Right represents Queensland and consists of a blue Maltese cross, bearing a Crown, on a white field.
The Lower Left represents South Australia and includes a piping shrike on a gold field.
The Lower Middle represents Western Australia and consists of a black swan on a gold field.
The Lower Right represents Tasmania and contains a red lion on a white field.

The gold seven-pointed star (the Commonwealth Star), represents the states and the territories. The blue disc was taken from the Queen's Personal Flag as used for duties within the Commonwealth of Nations.

The flag was used in two ratios, 1:2 and 22:31. The 1:2 ratio ensures the flag maintains visual integrity with other naval flags, which are 1:2. A 22:31 ratio gives simple dimensions for the flag elements, with a border of 2 units thick, and central squares of dimensions 9×9.

Use
The Queen's Personal Flag for Australia was only used when she was visiting Australia, on Her Majesty's Australian Ships, on official buildings, or other places only when the Queen was actually present. The only exception was for land-based parades in honour of her birthday, when it could be flown even when not present. When it was flown on or outside a building, it had to be the only flag present.

Coronation standards 
During the coronation ceremony of the monarch at Westminster Abbey, the "standards" of various countries are carried by various officials in the procession inside the abbey. These flags are the country's coat of arms as a banner of arms. For Australia, similar standards based on the current and previous coat of arms were used thrice: at the coronations of King George V, King George VI and Queen Elizabeth II in 1911, 1937, and 1953, respectively. The banner of the 1908-1912 coat of arms was used in 1911, with the banner of the current arms used in 1937 and 1953. The banner was in a 3:4 ratio and without defacement.

See also

List of Australian flags
Flag of the Governor-General of Australia
Flags of the governors of the Australian states

References

Barraclough, E. M. C. and Crampton, W. G. (1978). Flags of the World. London: Frederick Warne. . P. 207

External links
 Queen Elizabeth II's Personal Standard in Australia at Flags of the World. Accessed 8 February 2006.

Queen
Monarchy in Australia
Australia
1962 establishments in Australia
Flags displaying animals